Syed Ibne Abbas is a retired Pakistani diplomat who served as High Commissioner of Pakistan to United Kingdom. He is currently a member of Punjab Public Service Commission since November 2018.

Career 
Syed Ibne Abbas qualified CSS exam and joined Foreign Service of Pakistan in 1983. He belongs to 11th Common Training Program (CTP) of Central Superior Services and is a course mate of former ambassador of Pakistan to France Ghalib Iqbal.

During his career, he served as deputy secretary in Prime Minister's Office during tenures of Benazir Bhutto, Nawaz Sharif and Malik Meraj Khalid. He also served as Deputy High Commissioner of Pakistan to India (2001–03), Director General South Asia desk (2005–06) and Consul General Los Angeles (2006–10). He has also served as Pakistan's High Commissioner to New Zealand from 2010 to 2013. He was appointed High Commissioner of Pakistan to United Kingdom by then Prime Minister Nawaz Sharif in July 2014.

Personal life 
He is married to Sadaf Ibne Abbas and has three sons.

References 

Pakistani diplomats
Year of birth missing (living people)
Living people